The Hunters Palette or Lion Hunt Palette is a circa 3100 BCE cosmetic palette from the Naqada III period of late prehistoric Egypt. The palette is broken: part is held by the British Museum and part is in the collection of the Louvre.

Content
The Hunters Palette shows a complex iconography of lion hunting as well as the hunt of other animals such as birds, desert hares, and gazelle types; one gazelle is being contained by a rope. The weapons used in the twenty-man hunt are the bow and arrow, mace, throwing sticks, flint knives, and spears. Two iconographic conjoined bull-forefronts adorn the upper right alongside a hieroglyphic-like symbol similar to the "shrine" hieroglyph, sḥ. O21

Details

See also

List of ancient Egyptian palettes

References

External links
British Museum page on the Palette
Photo of Hunters Palette
Predynastic palette corpus
the Louvre fragment

4th-millennium BC works
Ancient Egyptian palettes
Ancient Egyptian objects in the British Museum
Birds in art
Mammals in art
Rabbits and hares in art
Lions in art
Naqada III